Thalay Valley is in Ghanche, Gilgit Baltistan, Pakistan, on the bank of Shyok River, The Shyok River meets Indus River at Keris about 30 kilometers west of Thalay. Thalay has 16 large and small mohallah: Daltir, Baltoro , Brooqpa Baltoro, Gongma Baltoro, Harangus, Chundu, Taso, Parangus, Haltagari, Yarkhor, Daltir, Gagurik , Burdas, Khasumik, etc. House Valley is to the east, Karis Valley to the west, Shiger Valley to the north and Daghini/Balghar are located to the south.

The main occupation is agriculture.

Socioeconomic 

S/No Description about Thalay Union Council	Number

Education 
The awareness of getting education in Thalay started hundreds of years ago. From that era most of them became Islamic school. After 1945 the few parents sent their children to school. They were 8–12 in number from village Harangus, yarkhor and baltoro. One of them became successful to get his goal. Behind his success was his mother. His mother was not educated but encouraged and helped him to get education. And he was Haji Ali Shah from Harangus Thalay. Then he struggled to spread education in Thalay. Initially there was no school. And because of his struggle new educational institutions are founded rapidly. Nowadays there are following institutions; 

 one higher secondary school 
 Two High school
 2 midel schools 
 4 primary schools
 Non-formal school
 6 BECS schools ( working now)
Total= 15

Infrastructure 
 BHU
(at Harangus)

 Fruit nursery (agriculture department)
 Post office
 Ration depot
 Hydle (power) station (Daltir)
 Hydle station phase I (Parangus)
 Hydle station phase II (Baltoro)

Health care 
 Four first aid posts
 A class dispensary
 Veterinary dispensaryReferences (harangus)
 C class dispensary (Tagari)

Nature resources 
 38 valleys for pasture
 Abundant water from glaciers
 Three Lakes

References 

	

Populated places in Ghanche District
Valleys of Gilgit-Baltistan